Yngve Axel Andreas Larsson (9 January 1917 – 22 March 2014) was a Swedish pediatrician, medicine professor and diabetologist.

Yngve Larsson was the fifth child of Stockholm vice mayor Yngve Larsson and Elin Larsson (daughter of publisher Karl Otto Bonnier). He graduated from Uppsala University in 1938 and gained his Ph.D. at Karolinska Institute in 1956. From 1964 he worked for Swedish International Development Cooperation Agency in Addis Abeba, Ethiopia, first as a professor and 1965-1970 as director of the Ethio-Swedish Pediatric Clinic (ESPC) at Haile Selassie I University. In parallel, his wife pediatrician Ulla Larsson established the Lideta Maternal and Child Health Center (or Lideta MCH Clinic) nearby with financing from the Swedish branch of Save the Children. In the 1970s Yngve Larsson worked in Linköping, Sweden, in charge of diabetology at Linköping University and initiating national research in the field.

Yngve Larsson was active in the International Society for Pediatric and Adolescent Diabetes (ISPAD) from its first year, and was a member of its Advisory Council in 1981–1984. After retiring in 1983, he worked within Swedish National Board of Health and Welfare for several years.

Larsson died from natural causes on 22 March 2014 in Lidingö. He was 97 years old.

References

External links
Yngve Larsson in LIBRIS

1917 births
2014 deaths
Swedish diabetologists
Uppsala University alumni
Karolinska Institute alumni
Academic staff of the Karolinska Institute
Academic staff of Linköping University
Physicians from Stockholm
Ethiopia–Sweden relations
Health in Ethiopia
1960s in Ethiopia
Academic staff of Addis Ababa University
Swedish tropical physicians
Swedish medical researchers
Swedish pediatricians